Umberto "Bert" Crenca is an American artist, arts administrator, arts advisor and educator. He is known for being a founder and long-time artistic director of the non-profit arts organization, AS220, in Providence, Rhode Island. He has been credited with helping to "lay the groundwork for much of the cultural development that shaped the Providence imaginary in the 1990s and early decades of the 21st century" by scholar Micah Salkind, and in 2010 was identified as one of Rhode Island's Most Influential People by Rhode Island Monthly.

Early life 
Crenca was born in Rhode Island in 1950.  In the 1980s, Crenca worked in the print shop of Fleet Bank. He graduated from the Rhode Island College in 1981 with a bachelor's degree in fine arts.

AS220 
Following an unfavorable review of Crenca's work in The Providence Journal in 1982, a group of artists gathered to condemn harsh art critiques. Together, they created a manifesto and sought to create a new art space. This resulted in Crenca founding AS220, a non-profit art space, in 1985. AS220 grew from a small performance and studio space in 1985 to the proprietor of live/work studios, exhibition spaces, multiple performance areas, teaching spaces, a restaurant and bar. Crenca describes his work at AS220 as being "extremely blurred" with his work as an artist, and describes AS220 as a "work of art."

Crenca retired as Artistic Director of AS220 in 2015, and served as an adjunct advisor and spokesperson for the organization through 2019.

Arts administration and education 
In his capacity as Artistic Director of AS220 and arts administrator, Crenca acted on local boards and committees as a representative of the Rhode Island arts community, including the Arts and Entertainment District Task Force in 1992, the mayoral transition committees of Providence mayors David Cicilline (2002)  and Jorge Elorza (2014), and the Providence School Board 2005-2008.

Crenca has spoken at numerous events as regarding place-making and community arts programs, including the keynote address Museums Aotearoa Conference in New Zealand in 2012, the TEDxProvidence conference in 2013, and The Cass Project's lecture series at the University at Buffalo in 2018.

Much of his work has centered around arts education and programming for youth, including the establishment of the Broad Street Studio, which evolved over time into what is now the AS220 Youth Program, and his work as an art instructor at the Rhode Island Training School and at AS220's education program for arts administrators, Practice//Practice.

Visual art, music and performance 
Crenca is a visual artist, musician and performer.  His style was described as "propelled by a prolific, relentless, try-everything-at-once drive" and "improvisational, free-association, automatic-writing, hallucinatory" by Greg Cook of the Providence Phoenix.

In the 1990s, Crenca co-lead a fluxus-based music and performance troupe, Meatballs/Fluxus. His other musical and performance collaborations include Monkee Head, Panic Band, and the Gillen Street Project.

Selected exhibitions 

 1984 - Galleria del Corso, Latino, Italy
 1985 - Antonio Dattorro Studio Gallery 
 2004 - Frenetic Engineering: censored/uncensored, Newport Art Museum and Blink Gallery, Newport, RI 
 2010 - You Can't Call Your Own Baby Ugly, AS220 Project Space, Providence, Rhode Island
 2007 - Just 'N Artist/Not an Artist at Firehouse 13 Gallery
 2014 - Puzzled, Machines with Magnets
 2017 - Pain and Such, Providence, RI, 82 Weybossett Street)

Awards and honors 

 1997 - Crenca was fellow in the Pew Civic Entrepreneur Initiative
 2005 - Pew Civic Entrepreneur Initiative Fellow 
 2010 - Rhode Island Pell Award for Excellence in the Arts
 2010 - Rhode Island College Charles B Willard Professional Achievement Award
 2011 - Rhode Island Foundation Community Service Award
 2013 - Rhode Island Arts and Culture and Tourism Making a Difference Award
 2016 - Honorary doctorate from Brown University
 2016 - Honorary doctorate from Roger Williams University
 2016 - Honored by the White House as one of the Champions of Change national initiative.
 2002 RI Foundation Fellow
 2003 Scholarship Recipient, Harvard University Business School

References 

Artists from Rhode Island
American arts administrators
Musicians from Rhode Island
Rhode Island College alumni
1950 births
Living people